The Princess and the Frog is a 2009 American animated film produced by Walt Disney Animation Studios.

The Princess and the Frog may also refer to:
 The Princess and the Frog (soundtrack)
 At the End of the Rainbow, a 1965 live action children's film released by Fantasy Films, Inc.

See also
 The Frog Prince (disambiguation)
 The Frog Princess